Jonathan “Jon" Thurston (born February 3, 1984, in Dunsford, Ontario) is a Canadian wheelchair curler.

Teams

References

External links
 
 
 
 
 

Living people
Canadian male curlers
Curlers from Ontario
Canadian wheelchair curlers
Place of birth missing (living people)
Wheelchair curlers at the 2022 Winter Paralympics
Medalists at the 2022 Winter Paralympics
Paralympic medalists in wheelchair curling
Paralympic bronze medalists for Canada
1984 births